Raron railway station is a railway station in the municipality of Raron, in the Swiss canton of Valais. It is an intermediate stop on the Simplon line and is served by local trains only.

Services 
The following services stop at Raron:

References

External links 
 
 
 

Railway stations in the canton of Valais
Swiss Federal Railways stations